Dwommo is a village situated on a main road in Tano South Municipal District, Ahafo Region, Ghana. Dwommo has a memorial park and a supermarket. According to a study, the agriculturally employed population of Dwommo was asked on their subjective wealth in relation to their livestock, and they considered themselves wealthy.

References 

Villages in Ghana
Populated places in the Ahafo Region